The Dalcassians are a Gaelic Irish clan, generally accepted by contemporary scholarship as being a branch of the Déisi Muman, that became very powerful in Ireland during the 10th century. Their genealogies claimed descent from Tál Cas. Their known ancestors are the subject of The Expulsion of the Déisi tale and one branch of their blood-line went on to rule the petty kingdom of Dyfed in Wales during the 4th century; probably in alliance with the Roman Emperor Magnus Maximus.

Brian Bóruma is perhaps the best-known king from the dynasty and was responsible to a significant degree for carving out their fortunes. The family had built a power base on the banks of the River Shannon and Brian's brother Mahon became their first King of Munster, taking the throne from the rival Eóganachta. This influence was greatly extended under Brian who became High King of Ireland, following a series of wars against Hiberno-Norse kingdoms and the Chiefs of other Irish clans, before dying famously at the Battle of Clontarf in 1014. Following this the Dál gCais provided three more High Kings of Ireland; Donnchad mac Briain, Toirdelbach Ua Briain and Muirchertach Ua Briain.

From the 12th–16th centuries, the Dál gCais contented themselves with being reduced to the Kingdom of Thomond. They attempted to claim the Kingdom of Desmond for a time, but ultimately the MacCarthys held it. The Kennedys also held the Kingdom of Ormond for a time. Some of the better known septs included O'Brien, Moloney, MacNamara, O'Grady, O'Gorman, Galvin, Kennedy, MacMahon, McInerney, and Clancy. During the 13th century Richard Strongbow's relatives the Norman de Clares attempted to take Thomond, but the Dál gCais held firm.

It wasn't until the 16th century, unable to be defeated militarily, they agreed to surrender and regrant their kingdom to Henry VIII Tudor, joining the nobility of the Kingdom of Ireland. Their realm was renamed County Clare, though they remained influential. In later times, remarkable figures include writer Standish James O'Grady, who is called "Father of the Celtic Revival" and William Smith O'Brien who played a leading part in the Young Irelander Rebellion of 1848. In diaspora, prominent figures have included Marshal Patrice de Mac-Mahon, President of France, as well as John F. Kennedy and Ronald Reagan, who were both Presidents of the United States.

History

Origins, Déisi Muman vs. Deirgtine
In their own genealogies, the Dál gCais traced their line back to their eponymous ancestor and progenitor Cormac Cas, who is said to have lived in the 2nd to 3rd century. They make him a second son of Ailill Aulom from the Deirgtine, a King of Munster and Leath Moga more generally, associated in a story with the goddess Áine of the Tuatha Dé Danann during the Cycles of the Kings of Irish mythology. Cormac Cas himself was purported to be the younger brother of Eógan, founder of the Eóganachta, who would go on to rule Munster for many centuries. While this was taken on face value for a long time, later Irish scholars came to question its validity, regarding it as a politically motivated fabrication. The Dál gCais were becoming powerful in the 10th century, with Mahon and his brother Brian Bóruma taking the throne in Munster from the Eóganachta; claiming ancient kinship with their rivals would have boosted their legitimacy.

It is claimed by current scholarship that the Dál gCais were instead a branch of the Déisi Muman. The Déisi Muman held a vassal kingship in Munster under the Eóganachta, significant in scope, consisting of what is today Waterford and its environs. As time went on branches also emerged around the River Shannon, as part of the Déisi Muman moved north-westerly between the 5th and early 8th century; they were called the Déisi Deiscirt and the Déisi Tuisceart. It is from later, more northerly branch, which the Dál gCais are said to ultimately find their true ancestors.  The first recorded mention of their adoption of the new name Dál gCais specifically is in the Annals of Inisfallen for the year 934, which records the death of their king Rebachán mac Mothlai.

The Déisi Muman themselves are subject of The Expulsion of the Déisi epic in the Cycles of the Kings, which is set during the time that Cormac Ulfada was High King of Ireland. The story describes the expulsion of the Dal Fiachrach Suighe; kinsmen of the Connachta and descendants of Fedlimid Rechtmar; from Tara, coming to settle in Munster after many battles. Upon becoming the Déisi Muman, one branch then sailed across to Britain in the 4th century, coming to rule Dyfed. Their presence in Britain may have been initially supported by Magnus Maximus, Roman Emperor, as part of a policy of backing Gaelic vassals to be seafaring defenders of the shores of Britain facing the Irish Sea from pirates. Eoin MacNeill has pointed out that they were not the only Irish colony in the area, with the Uí Liatháin also powerful.

Ascent to the High Kingship of Ireland

The adoption of the name Dál gCais and the ascent of the group to greater power, began to take place during the 10th century with internal political transition. With the death of Rebachán mac Mothlai, the leadership of the Déisi Tuisceart shifted from the Uí Aengusa kindred to their junior relatives the Uí Thairdelbaig. It was during the time of Kennedy, who styled himself King of Thomond, that the Dál gCais began to challenge the Eóganachta; though Kennedy was defeated at the Battle of Gort Rotacháin by Cellach Caisil, King of Munster in 944. The actual reason for this sudden surge has been much debated and one frequently discussed thesis is that it was a political scheme of the Uí Néill, intending to use the Dál gCais as proxies to further weaken the power of the Eóganachta.

Kennedy's children built on their father's achievements. His daughter Órlaith became Queen consort of Ireland, after she married Donagh Donn, a High King of Ireland from the southern branch of the Uí Néill. Mahon became the first Dál gCais to gain the kingship of Munster, after he seized the Rock of Cashel from Molloy of the Eóganachta. Leading up to this he had defeated the Norse under Ivar of Limerick at the Battle of Sulcoit in 968. After Mahon was captured by Donovan in 976 and murdered by Molloy, the Eóganachta returned to the throne at Cashel for two years, but Mahon's younger brother Brian Bóruma, a seasoned military man from the early campaigns, would desire vengeance.

A campaign in 977-78 led to the defeat and death of Ivar, with an engagement at Scattery Island being the most significant. Brian retained the formerly Norse Limerick for its trading power and naval strength. The Dál gCais took back Munster at Belach Lechta the same year, killing Molloy in the process. Ambition saw Brian look next to the territories of Malachy II, High King of Ireland. A closely contested war of 15 years ensued, with the naval ability of the Dál gCais paying off as a truce was called by Malachy in 997, recognising Brian's overlordship of Leath Moga. They became allies against the Norse Dublin and the Laigin who under Máel Mórda, King of Leinster had risen against Brian's claims. The latter were subdued at Glenmama in 999, before rebelling again in 1014 at Clontarf where Norse power in Ireland was finally broken, though Brian died in the process. In the interim, Malachy had passed the High Kingship to Brian in 1002 and he built strong Christian links to Armagh.

After the death of Brian, his two established surviving sons; Donagh and Teague; struggled in an internal Dál gCais rivalry for dominion. While Donagh was High King, many other Irish kings allied against him, including Leinster, Connacht, and Ulster. Deposed in 1063, he fled to Rome, with some sources claiming he granted Pope Urban II the Irish crown, this is controversial, however. Teague's son Turlough took up the reins in a lasting alliance with the powerful Dermot Kinsella, King of Leinster. Not a military leader, Turlough was instead a capable politician, the Cogad Gáedel re Gallaib glorifying Brian's feats would be authored during his lifetime. Turlough's son Murtagh would be the last High King from the Dál gCais of the medieval period, reigning between 1101–19. Murtagh attempted to make the Irish kingship more along the lines of European monarchies and was involved in foreign affairs (allying with Arnulf de Montgomery in the Welsh Marches against Henry I, King of England), trying to extend Irish influence beyond internal rivalries.

Dynastic divisions

Septs and kindreds
The septs of the Dál gCais developed over time, with new ones breaking off to form separate surnames at different times, but all claiming to share the same paternal line (with a few biological exceptions along the way due to adoption or extra-marital issue). Their eponymous founder Cas had several sons; two of them gave their names to the Uí Bloid and Uí Caisin kindreds, another founded the Ui Fearmaic. As the proto-Dál gCais moved up into what is today East Clare, these became associated with rooted tribal areas, but were themselves internally divided into any other septs.

The senior line descended from Cas' first son Bloid and they provided the Kings of Thomond. Initially the leaders of the tribe were a sept known as the Uí Aengusa from which descends O'Curry, O'Cormacan and O'Seasnain. However, during the 10th century, this passed to the junior Uí Thairdelbaig. It is this kindred which would furnish the High Kings of Ireland and the Kings of Thomond including Brian Bóruma. From the Uí Thairdelbaig came O'Brien, O'Kennedy (who were Kings of Ormond), MacConsidine, MacMahon, O'Reagan, MacLysaght, O'Kelleher, Boland, Cramer, Kearney, O'Casey, Power, Twomey, Eustace, Ahearne, MacGrath, Quick, O'Meara, Scanlan, MacArthur, Cosgrave, O'Hogan, Lonergan and others. O'Noonan and Coombe are other notable Uí Bloid descendants. A younger brother of Carthann Fionn (who both the Uí Thairdelbaig and Uí Aengusa derive) named Brennan Ban stands at the head of the genealogies for the O'Brennan, Glinn, Muldowney and O'Hurley septs.

Although a junior line, the Uí Caisin continued to have a prominent role and the leader of their kindred in Thomond were the MacNamara, who as Lords of Clancullen, were the second most powerful family after the O'Brien. Other families descended from the branch of Carthann (son of Caisin) include Harley, Flood, Torrens, Stoney, Hickey, O'Hay, Clancy, Neylon and Flattery. Carthann had brothers named Eocha and Sineall from whom descend the O'Grady, Tubridy, Hartigan, Durkin, Killeen and Hogg. In addition to this, there are the Ui Fearmaic who claim to descend from Aengus Cinathrach, a brother of Caisin and Bloid. This kindred included the O'Dea as leaders, as well as the O'Quin, O'Griffin / O'Griffey (chieftains of Cineal Cuallachta), O'Heffernan, Kielty and Perkin.

Titles and social roles
Within the traditional Gaelic culture of Ireland, society rested on the pillars of the tribal nobility, bardic poet historians and priests. Different families had different roles to play and in many cases, this was a hereditary role. However, the nature of this system, known as tanistry was aristocratic ("rule by the best") in the truest sense, in that if the tribe thought a younger male member of the family was more suitable to succeed to a role than an older sibling, then they could. The Norman and wider European concept of strict primogeniture was not completely adopted until after some of the families joined the peerage of Ireland.

The most powerful Dalcassian family of the hereditary Gaelic nobility were the O'Brien (Kings of Thomond), followed by MacNamara (Lords of Clann Cuilean), O'Kennedy (Kings of Ormond), MacMahon (Lords of Corca Baiscinn), O'Grady (Lords of Cinél Dongaile) and O'Dea (Lords of Ui Fearmaic). Some of these families later joined the peerage of Ireland after the surrender and regrant to the Tudors during the 16th century. The O'Brien was initially Earls of Thomond, but later became Barons Inchiquin which they hold to this day. The O'Grady was Viscounts Guillamore, while the O'Quins became Earls of Dunraven. A branch of the MacMahon family became Marquis de MacMahon d'Eguilly in the Kingdom of France, later raised to Dukes of Magenta under Emperor Napoleon III.

The Clancy sept was the hereditary Brehons of Thomond and held a very powerful position when it came to the law in the kingdom. Even after the end of the Gaelic order, they continued to play a role, providing a High Sheriff of Clare in the form of Boetius Clancy. Famously participating in the Contention of the Bards in support of the honour of the tribe, the MacBrody sept were the principal poets and historians of the Dál gCais over the course of centuries. The O'Hickey and Neylon sept would serve as hereditary physicians to the Dalcassians of Thomond. After the Norman Butler dynasty took Ormond, the Dalcassian sept of O'Meara became their hereditary physicians, this line included Barry Edward O'Meara, who was with Emperor Napoleon I in exile at St. Helena.

Chieftainship
What became known as the Dál gCais stemmed from the Deisi Becc (Small Deisi) who controlled a narrow strip of land stretching from the Ballyhoura mountains to the Shannon and were divided into the Deisi Deiscirt (Southern Deisi, centred around Bruree) and Deisi Tuaiscirt (Northern Deisi, centred around Cahernarry) who shared a common ancestry. Their conquest of modern Clare probably occurred after the Battle of Carn Feradaig in 629AD where, under their king Díoma mac Rónáin, they defeated the King of Connacht Guaire Aidne mac Colmáin who was invading Munster. After this their Kings first appear in contemporary records. Andelait, son of Díoma is one of eight Munster kings listed as guarantors of the Cáin Adomnáin in 697. In 713 the Deisi Tuaiscirt killed the King of Cashel Cormac mac Ailello in battle at Carn Feradaig after he had invaded their territories. In 744 the annals note: "Destruction of Corco Mruad by the Déis" which indicates their power in Thomond was growing. In 765 the death of their king Torpaid is noted in the annals. From this point forwards the annals are silent on the Deisi Tuaiscirt until 934.<ref>Bart Jaski, The (legendary) rise of Dál Cais', in: Seán Duffy (ed.), Medieval Dublin XVI: proceedings of Clontarf 1014–2014: national conference marking the millennium of the Battle of Clontarf (Dublin, 2017). 15–61., https://www.academia.edu/38265900/Bart_Jaski_The_legendary_rise_of_D%C3%A1l_Cais_in_Se%C3%A1n_Duffy_ed._Medieval_Dublin_XVI_proceedings_of_Clontarf_1014_2014_national_conference_marking_the_millennium_of_the_Battle_of_Clontarf_Dublin_2017_._15_61?source=swp_share </ref>

In 934 the annals report the death of Reabacán mac Mothla who is described as King of the Dál gCais (the earliest extant usage of this dynastic name) and Abbot of Tuaim Gréine and in the same year his son was killed by one of the sons of Lorcáin mac Lachtna (who is said to succeed Rebeacán as king), the annals report "Duibhghiolla, son of Robacáin, Lord of Ua Corbmaic, was murdered by Congalach son of Lorcáin in treachery".  This action must have paved the way for Lorcán and his sons to seize power. Lorcán was descended from the Uí Toirdhealbhach instead of the Uí Oengusso who had hitherto comprised the Deisi Tuaiscirt kings. Cinnéidigh, another son of Lorcáin, who became king after his father, expanded the power of the Dál gCais greatly and was noted as King of Thomond in the annals by his death. His son Mathgamain built on his achievements, capturing Cashel and becoming King of Munster. The best-known member of this dynasty, Brian Boru, took over after his brother Mathgamain's death, reclaimed the Munster kingship and eventually succeeded in establishing himself as High King of Ireland before his famous death in the Battle of Clontarf.

The Dál gCais under Brian's descendants, the Ua Briain would provide a further three High Kings of Ireland and exercised supremacy in Munster until Tairrdelbach Ua Conchobair, taking advantage of war between brothers Diarmait and former High-King Muircheartach, invaded Munster and split it in two in the Treaty of Glanmire (1118) granting Thomond to the sons of Diarmait Ua Briain and Desmond to the leading sept of the dispossessed Eoganacht, the Mac Cárthaigh dynasty. After the death of Domnall Mór Ua Briain, a claimant to the Kingship of Munster, they further retreated beyond the Shannon into the area of modern County Clare in the wake of the Norman Invasion. In 1276 King Edward II granted all of Thomond to Thomas de Clare, taking advantage of the feuding between Clann Taidhg and Clann Briain (whom de Clare supported). The de Clares failed in conquering Thomond and were decisively defeated in the Battle of Dysert O'Dea in 1318, thus the Kingdom of Thomond remained outside of foreign control for a further 200 years.

In 1543 Murchadh Carrach Ó Briain, agreed to surrender his Gaelic Royalty to King Henry VIII and accepted the titles Earl of Thomond and Baron Inchiquin. At his death in 1551 the Earldom passed to his nephew Donough by special remainder and the title Baron Inchiquin passed to his male heirs through his son Dermot. The Earldom went extinct at the death of Henry O'Brien, 8th Earl of Thomond, the next heir would have been a descendant of Daniel O'Brien, 3rd Viscount Clare who was attainded in 1691, so the title became forfeit. However, Charles O'Brien, 6th Viscount Clare, a Jacobite exile used the title Earl of Thomond, as did his son, who died childless in 1774. At the death of James O'Brien, 3rd Marquess of Thomond, the title Baron Inchiquin passed to a distant cousin and descendant of Murrough, Sir Lucius O'Brien, 5th Baronet and was passed down to his descendants.

This early list of Dál gCais Kings is supplied in An Leabhar Muimhneach.

Key:
= King of Northern Deisi
= King of Thomond
= Baron Inchiquin
=Viscount Clare
=Earl of Thomond, Earl of Inchiquin
=Marquess of Thomond

A higher Kingship title which is mutually inclusive with a lower one within the dynasty are not given overlapping dates for the simplicity of the chart.

Annalistic references

 AI1021.2 Mael Muire Ua Gébennaig, eminent priest of Dál Cais, rested.Legacy
In two different election pamphlets, Éamon de Valera's Fianna Fáil party addressed voters as "Dalcassians", the term having become a romantic synecdoche for the Irish as a whole.

See also
 Irish nobility
 Irish royal families

Notes

References

Footnotes

Bibliography

 
 
 
 
 
 Byrne, Francis John, Irish Kings and High-Kings. Four Courts Press. 2nd edition, 2001.
 MacLysaght, Edward, Irish Families: Their Names, Arms and Origins. Irish Academic Press. 4th edition, 1998.
 O'Brien, Barry, Munster at War''. Cork: Mercier Press. 1971.
 
 Todd, James Henthorn (ed. and tr.), Cogadh Gaedhel re Gallaibh: The War of the Gaedhil with the Gaill  Longmans. 1867.
 "Dál gCais – Church and Dynasty", Donncha Ó Corráin,

External links
 Tribes and Territories of Northern Munster: Dál gCais
 The Tribe of Cas at DalcassianSept.com
 Irish Type III at IrishType3DNA.org
 R-L226 Project at Family Tree DNA

 
Gaelic-Irish nations and dynasties
History of County Clare
History of County Limerick
History of County Tipperary
Gaels